The 2013 FIBA Europe Under-18 Championship Division B was an international basketball  competition held in Macedonia in 2013.

Final ranking

1.  Montenegro

2.  Poland

3.  Belgium

4.  Macedonia

5.  Israel

6.  Sweden

7.  Estonia

8.  Netherlands

9.  Finland

10.  Portugal

11.  Germany

12.  Belarus

13.  Hungary

14.  Norway

15.  Switzerland

16.  Romania

17.  Denmark

18.  Slovakia

19.  Luxembourg

20.  Austria

21.  Georgia

22.  Scotland

Awards

External links
FIBA Archive

FIBA U18 European Championship Division B
2013–14 in European basketball
2013–14 in Republic of Macedonia basketball
International youth basketball competitions hosted by North Macedonia